Watson Valve Services, Incorporated, known as Watson Valve is an industrial company based in Houston, Texas. It makes, repairs and modifies valves used in the petrochemical industry. The firm is privately owned and established in 1972.

References

Manufacturing companies based in Texas
Manufacturing companies established in 1972
1972 establishments in Texas